Wat Bot is a subdistrict in the Wat Bot district of Phitsanulok province, Thailand.

Geography
Wat Bot lies in the Nan Basin, which is part of the Chao Phraya Watershed.

Administration
The subdistrict is divided into 10 smaller divisions called (muban), which roughly correspond to villages of Wat Bot.  There are six villages, several of which occupy more than one muban. Wat Bot is administrated by a Tambon administrative organization (TAO). The mubans in Wat Bot are enumerated as follows:

Temples
The following is a list of active Buddhist temples in Tambon Wat Bot:
วัดท่างาม in Ban Tha Ngam
วัดช่างเหล็ก in Ban Wat Bot
วัดบัวหลวง in Ban Wat Bot
วัดโบสถ์ in Ban Wat Bot
วัดคลองช้าง in Ban Khlong Chang
วัดบ้านเนินมะคึก in Ban Noen Makhuet
วัดหนองขอน in Ban Nong Kon

References

Tambon of Phitsanulok province
Populated places in Phitsanulok province